The discography of the Australian rock band Tonight Alive consists of four studio albums, three extended plays, seventeen singles and seventeen music videos.

Albums

Studio albums

EPs

Singles

Original compilation appearances

Videography

Music videos

References

Discographies of Australian artists
Pop punk group discographies